Beaufortia huangguoshuensis is a species of ray-finned fish in the genus Beaufortia.

Footnotes 
 

Beaufortia (fish)
Fish described in 1987